Hoseynabad (also Romanized as Ḩoseynābād and ’oseynābād) is a village in Dashtab Rural District, in the Central District of Baft County, Kerman Province, Iran. At the 2006 census, its population was 29, in 6 families.

References 

Populated places in Baft County